Morimasa (written: 守正 or 盛政) is a masculine Japanese given name. Notable people with the name include:

 (1874–1951), Japanese prince and general
 (1554–1583), Japanese samurai

Japanese masculine given names